Testosterone cyclohexylpropionate (TCHP; brand names Andromar, Femolone, Telipex Retard) is an androgen and anabolic steroid and a testosterone ester.

See also
 Estradiol diundecylate/hydroxyprogesterone heptanoate/testosterone cyclohexylpropionate
 List of combined sex-hormonal preparations § Androgens

References

Abandoned drugs
Androgens and anabolic steroids
Androstanes
Testosterone esters